"Let Your Love Flow" is the debut single by country music duo the Bellamy Brothers, recorded in the autumn of 1975 and released in January 1976. The song was written by Larry E. Williams and produced by Phil Gernhard and Tony Scotti. It became an international hit, reaching number one in several countries including the United States and Germany, while reaching the top ten in at least nine others including the United Kingdom and Australia.

History
The song's composer, Larry E. Williams, had been a roadie for Neil Diamond's live shows, and "Let Your Love Flow" had been published by Bicycle Music, which had been founded by the singer and owned Diamond's own catalog. On Diamond's apparent disinterest in recording the song himself, Howard Bellamy of the Bellamy Brothers has commented "it really wasn't in his [ie. Diamond's] vein." According to Howard, Johnny Rivers had also passed on "Let Your Love Flow". The song as recorded by Gene Cotton was a single release in the autumn of 1975, making Cotton's version - featured on his 1976 album release For All the Young Writers - the earliest released version of "Let Your Love Flow," although it is unclear if Cotton's recording was made prior to that by the Bellamy Brothers.

The Bellamy Brothers - siblings David and Howard Bellamy from Pasco County - had been working as session musicians at the Studio 70 recording studio in Tampa when a demo of a song written by David, "Spiders and Snakes", was optioned for Jim Stafford, whose 1973 recording became a million-selling hit single. On the recommendation of Stafford's producer Phil Gernhard, the Bellamy Brothers relocated to Los Angeles to pursue a recording career. The duo initially stayed with Stafford in the Hollywood house whose purchase Stafford's success with "Spiders and Snakes" had made possible, and for a time Howard acted as Stafford's road manager while Gernhard arranged for David to record as a solo act for the Warner Bros. Records affiliate Curb Records with a resultant regional hit, "Nothin' Heavy", #77 on the Billboard Hot 100 in the autumn of 1975.

David Bellamy's recording sessions featured members of Neil Diamond's band, including drummer Dennis St John, and it was St John who recommended "Let Your Love Flow" to the Bellamys. Howard Bellamy recalls that Dennis St John "one day...came over to our house and brought the demo of 'Let Your Love Flow' and said: 'Hey, this sounds like something you guys would do.'" David Bellamy recalls St John mentioning the song as appropriate for the Bellamys to record, but that St John sent the demo of the song to Phil Gernhard: David Bellamy (quote) - "the next day I went to Phil's office and listened to it. I [then] called Howard and said :'I’ve got to play you this song!'" David further states: "We went back in with Neil's band" - to the Wally Heider Recording Studio in Hollywood - "and cut the song. We got the right key, the band hooked it right away and we probably didn’t do more than two or three takes on the whole session. It was the perfect song for us and became the key to our career."

"Let Your Love Flow" reached #1 on the Billboard Hot 100 dated 1 May 1976, also crossing-over to the Billboard chart rankings for Hot Adult Contemporary Tracks with a peak of #2, and also for Hot Country Singles with a peak of #21. According to David Bellamy (quote): "There were a couple of guys from Holland [i.e. the Netherlands] who were in town when the single was released, and our record company gave it to them to take home and they also sent it to Germany", and "Let Your Love Flow" would in fact debut at #22 on the Dutch Top 30 chart dated 6 March 1976, the same date as the track's Billboard Top 40 debut at #38: the track would eventually peak at #6 on both the Dutch chart and Belgium's Flemish chart. In June and July 1976 "Let Your Love Flow" spent five weeks at #1 in Germany and also in Switzerland, while the track would be ranked at #1 on the monthly Austrian hit parades dated the 15th of August, September and October. "Let Your Love Flow" was afforded further European success with a seven-week tenure at #2 in both Norway and Sweden, while in the British Isles the track achieved chart peaks of #7 in the UK and #3 in Ireland. "Let Your Love Flow" also reached #1 on the hit parade for South Africa, #2 in New Zealand and #6 in Australia.

Revival and use in media
In 2008 and 2009 "Let Your Love Flow" enjoyed a UK chart renaissance when it was featured in a television ad for Barclays promoting the bank's Barclaycard in its contactless format. Filmed in Rio de Janeiro and São Paulo, the ad's focus was on an office clerk - played by Robert Wilfort - who utilizes his Barclaycard while traveling home on a waterslide, a metaphor for the ease with which the card may be used. The ad was first aired 25 October 2008, and two weeks later "Let Your Love Flow" re-entered the UK Top 100 singles chart dated 8 November 2008 at #48, with the track eventually peaking at #21 over a six-week tenure with subsequent UK chart tenures of five weeks in February/ March 2009 (peak #48) and three weeks that summer (#76). Speaking for the Bellamy Brothers, David Bellamy would state: "We had no idea the song 'Let Your Love Flow' had been licensed to Barclay for an advertisement [until] after the single started climbing the charts in England. Any artist is always thrilled when one of your signature songs has longevity like this because it was thirty-two years ago when we first released the tune. We’ve always had such faithful fans in Europe, like we do in the United States, but with the single charting again we’re introducing our music to a whole new generation of music lovers."  
 
In other media, "Let Your Love Flow" was featured in the 1980 Tatum O'Neal film Little Darlings, the 1998 comedy Slums of Beverly Hills, the 2008 period drama Swingtown, and season 2 episode 'No Room at the Inn' of the HBO series The Leftovers.  The song was featured in Fernando Livschitz's short film titled AR 1304.  Joan Baez's version was featured in the 2019 film Can You Keep a Secret? over the end credits.

"Let Your Love Flow" has been covered by numerous other artists, most notably Joan Baez, who included it on her 1979 Honest Lullaby album. Another re-recording by the Bellamy brothers with Gölä is included on the album The Greatest Hits Sessions.  "Ein Bett im Kornfeld", a German language adaptation of the song recorded by Jürgen Drews, spent six weeks at #1 in West Germany in 1976, immediately subsequent to the five-week #1 tenure of the Bellamy Brothers' original.
The Jamaican singer John Holt did a lovers rock cover version of "Let Your Love Flow" in 1982, which saw major label release as a 7" single in West Germany on Teldec Records.

Charts

Weekly charts

Year-end charts

Certifications

References

1976 songs
1976 debut singles
The Bellamy Brothers songs
Gene Cotton songs
Joan Baez songs
Billboard Hot 100 number-one singles
Cashbox number-one singles
Number-one singles in Austria
Number-one singles in Germany
Number-one singles in South Africa
Number-one singles in Switzerland
Warner Records singles
Curb Records singles